The world's superlative trees can be ranked by any factor. Records have been kept for trees with superlative height, trunk diameter or girth, canopy coverage, airspace volume, wood volume, estimated mass, and age.

Tallest

The heights of the tallest trees in the world have been the subject of considerable dispute and much exaggeration. Modern verified measurements with laser rangefinders or with tape drop measurements made by tree climbers (such as those carried out by canopy researchers), have shown that some older tree height measurement methods are often unreliable, sometimes producing exaggerations of 5% to 15%  or more above the real height.

The following are the tallest reliably measured specimens from the top 10 species. This table shows only currently standing specimens:

Tallest historically
Despite the high heights attained by trees nowadays, records exist of much greater heights in the past, before widespread logging took place. Some, if not most, of these records are without a doubt greatly exaggerated, but some have been reportedly measured with semi-reliable instruments when cut down and on the ground. Some of the heights recorded in this way exceed the maximum possible height of a tree as calculated by theorists, lending some limited credibility to speculation that some superlative trees are able to 'reverse' transpiration streams and absorb water through needles in foggy environments. All three of the tallest tree species continue to be Coast redwoods, Douglas fir and Giant mountain ash.

Largest

The largest trees are defined as having the highest wood volume in a single stem. These trees are both tall and large in diameter and, in particular, hold a large diameter high up the trunk. Measurement is very complex, particularly if branch volume is to be included as well as the trunk volume, so measurements have only been made for a small number of trees, and generally only for the trunk. Few attempts have ever been made to include root or leaf volume.

All 12 of the world's largest trees are Giant sequoias. Grogan's Fault, the largest living Coast redwood, would rank as the 13th largest living tree. Tāne Mahuta, the largest living tree outside of California, would rank within the top 100 largest living trees.

Stoutest

The girth of a tree is usually much easier to measure than the height, as it is a simple matter of stretching a tape round the trunk, and pulling it taut to find the circumference. Despite this, UK tree author Alan Mitchell made the following comment about measurements of yew trees:

As a general standard, tree girth is taken at "breast height". This is converted to and cited as dbh (diameter at breast height) in tree and forestry literature. Breast height is defined differently in different situations, with most forestry measurements taking girth at 1.3 m above ground, while those who measure ornamental trees usually measure at 1.5 m above ground; in most cases this makes little difference to the measured girth. On sloping ground, the "above ground" reference point is usually taken as the highest point on the ground touching the trunk, but in North America a point, that is the average of the highest point and the lowest point the tree trunk appears to contact the soil, is usually used. Some of the inflated old measurements may have been taken at ground level. Some past exaggerated measurements also result from measuring the complete next-to-bark measurement, pushing the tape in and out over every crevice and buttress. The measurements could also be influenced by deviation of the tape measure from a horizontal plane (which might seem called for if the trunk does not grow straight up), and the presence of features such as branches, spikes, etc.

Modern trends are to cite the tree's diameter rather than the circumference. The diameter of the tree is calculated by finding the mean diameter of the trunk, in most cases obtained by dividing the measured circumference by π; this assumes the trunk is mostly circular in cross-section (an oval or irregular cross-section would result in a mean diameter slightly greater than the assumed circle). Accurately measuring circumference or diameter is difficult in species with the large buttresses that are characteristic of many species of rainforest trees. Simple measurement of circumference of such trees can be misleading when the circumference includes much empty space between buttresses. See also Tree girth measurement

Baobabs (genus Adansonia) store large amounts of water in the very soft wood in their trunks. This leads to marked variation in their girth over the year (though not more than about 2.5%), reaching maximum at the end of the rainy season, and minimum at the end of the dry season.

Measurements become ambiguous when multiple trunks (whether from an individual tree or multiple trees) grow together.
The Sacred Fig grows adventitious roots from its branches, which become new trunks when the root reaches the ground and thickens; a single sacred fig tree can have hundreds of such trunks. The multi-stemmed Hundred Horse Chestnut was known to have a circumference of  when it was measured in 1780.

There are known more than 50 species of trees exceeding the diameter of 4.45 m or circumference of 14 m.

Broadest
The trees with the broadest crowns have the widest spread of limbs from a single trunk.

Oldest

The oldest trees are determined by growth rings, which can be seen if the tree is cut down, or in cores taken from the bark to the center of the tree. Accurate determination is only possible for trees that produce growth rings, generally those in seasonal climates. Trees in uniform non-seasonal tropical climates grow continuously and do not have distinct growth rings. It is also only possible for trees that are solid to the center. Many very old trees become hollow as the dead heartwood decays. For some of these species, age estimates have been made on the basis of extrapolating current growth rates, but the results are usually largely speculation. White (1998) proposes a method of estimating the age of large and veteran trees in the United Kingdom through the correlation of a tree's age with its diameter and growth character.

The verified oldest measured ages are:

Other species suspected of reaching exceptional age include European Yew (Taxus baccata) (probably over 2,000 years), Sugi (Cryptomeria japonica) (3,000 years or more), and Western Redcedar (Thuja plicata). The oldest known European Yew may be the Llangernyw Yew in the Churchyard of Llangernyw village in North Wales, or the Fortingall Yew in Perthshire, Scotland. These yews may be from 1,500 to 3,000 years old.

Lagarostrobos franklinii, known as Huon pine, is native to the wet southwestern corner of Tasmania, Australia. A stand of trees in excess of 10,500 years old was found in 1955 in western Tasmania on Mount Read. Each of the trees in this stand is a genetically identical male that has reproduced vegetatively. Although no single tree in this stand is of that age, the stand itself as a single organism has existed that long. Individual trees in the clonal patch have been listed as having ages of 2000 or even to 3000 years old.

The olive tree also can live for centuries.  The oldest verified age is 900 years at Gethsemane (Mount of Olives, as mentioned in the Bible), while several other olive trees are suspected of being 2,000 to 3,000 years old.

The pond cypress, Taxodium ascendens, has been known to live more than 1,000 years. One specimen in particular, named "The Senator", was estimated to be more than 3,400 years old at the time of its demise in early 2012.

Deepest and longest tree roots
El Drago Milenario, a tree of species Dracaena draco on Tenerife, Canary Islands, Spain, is reported to have  aerial roots.

Thickest tree limbs
This list is limited to horizontal or nearly horizontal limbs, in which the governing growth factor is phototropism. Vertical or near vertical limbs, in which the governing growth factor is negative geotropism, are called "reiterations" and are really divisions of the trunk, which by definition must be less than the trunk as a whole and therefore less remarkable. The thickest trunks have already been dealt with under "stoutest".

Thickest tree bark

Trees bearing the largest flowers

Largest leaves (by type)

See also 

 Champion Trees
 Dendrology
 Dendrometry
 Lists of trees
 List of oldest trees
 List of old-growth forests
 List of individual trees
 List of superlative trees in Sweden
 List of Champion Trees (South Africa)
 List of tree genera
 List of trees and shrubs by taxonomic family
 List of world records held by plants
 Tree allometry
 Tree crown measurement
 Tree girth measurement 
 Tree height measurement
 Tree measurement
 Tree volume measurement

References

External links

 Notable and Ancient Trees in Britain and Ireland
 Monumental trees
 M. D. Vaden, arborist who measures tree sizes
 Calaveras Big Trees Association (CBTA)
 Tasmania's giant trees
 National Register of Big Trees. Australia's Champion Trees
 Old Trees in The Netherlands and Western Europe
 Photo Tours: Science Atop the World's Largest Trees
 Article about The Senator
 The New Zealand Tree Register – A project of the New Zealand Notable Trees Trust (NZNTT)

Trees
Lists of trees
Forest ecology
Trees